Vitis jaegeriana is a plant species in the grape family that is endemic to North-Central Mexico.

The vine is native to the state of San Luis Potosí region, including habitats in the Sierra Madre Oriental range .

It is a tertiary genetic relative of wine grapes.

References

jaegeriana
Endemic flora of Mexico
Flora of San Luis Potosí
Plants described in 1991
Flora of the Sierra Madre Oriental